Contamination is a 1996 album by Belgian electro-industrial act Suicide Commando.

Track listing

"Fall Away"
"See You In Hell, Part 1 & 2 (Extended Mix)"
"Head Down"
"Delusion"
"The Face Of God"
"Traumatize (Clubmix)"
"See You In Hell (Remake By Monolith)"
"Burn Baby Burn"

In 1997, there was a re-release of Contamination with three more tracks listed called "Save Me (Long)", "Last Decision", and "Murder (Extended)".

Suicide Commando albums
1996 albums